The 1954 Australian Grand Prix was a motor race held at the Southport Road Circuit near Southport in Queensland, Australia on 7 November 1954.  The race was held over 27 laps of the 5.7 mile (9.17 kilometre) circuit, a total distance of 153.9 miles (247.6 km). It was the nineteenth Australian Grand Prix and the second to be held in Queensland. With no suitable permanent circuit available, a course was mapped out on roads in sparsely settled coastal land 2.5 km south west of Southport, and just to the north of later circuits, Surfers Paradise Raceway and the Surfers Paradise Street Circuit. The Grand Prix race meeting was organised by the Queensland Motor Sporting Club and the Toowoomba Auto Club in conjunction with the Southport Rotary Club. The race, which was open to Racing and Stripped Sports Cars, had 28 starters.

The race was won by Lex Davison, later to become the most successful driver in the history of the Australian Grand Prix. It was Davison's first win in the Grand Prix having finished in the top three as far back as 1947. Davison drove a Formula 2 HWM re-engined with a 3.4 litre Jaguar engine. Davison finished a lap clear of Curley Brydon's MG TC special and two laps ahead of third placed Ken Richardson in a Ford based special. The gaps were caused by attrition amongst the fastest drivers. Jack Brabham was out on the second lap with a broken engine in his Cooper; Rex Taylor was black flagged for receiving outside assistance after spinning his Lago-Talbot; Dick Cobden retired his Ferrari after a spin and Stan Jones crashed heavily while leading after his chassis failed. It would be the last race for the Mk.II Maybach special, Charlie Dean's team rebuilding it as the Maybach III.

Classification 

Results as follows.

 Pole position: Rex Taylor (Allocated by the race organisers prior to the event)
 Winner's average speed: 83.7 mph (134.7 km/h)
 Fastest lap: Dick Cobden (Ferrari), 3:52s, 88.45 mph, 142.3 km/h
 Attendance: More than 60,000

References

External links
 Advertisement, Australian Motor Sports, October 1954, page 11, as saved at photobucket.com

Grand Prix
Australian Grand Prix
Sport on the Gold Coast, Queensland
Australian Grand Prix